Hsiung Feng ("Brave Wind") may refer to various missiles developed by the Chungshan Institute of Science and Technology in Taiwan:

Hsiung Feng I (HF-1), an anti-ship missile system developed between 1975 and 1978
Hsiung Feng II (HF-2), an anti-ship missile system with several versions in service
Hsiung Feng IIE (HF-2E), an advanced surface-to-surface cruise missile system
Hsiung Feng III (HF-3), the third in the Hsiung Feng series of anti-ship missiles; very little is known about it except that it is a Mach number 2 class supersonic speed anti-ship missile